Soosia is a genus of air-breathing land snails, terrestrial pulmonate gastropod mollusks in the family Helicodontidae.

Species 
Species within the genus Soosia include:
 Soosia diodonta

References

 Nomenclator Zoologicus info

Helicodontidae